Douglas Brian "Pete" Peterson (born June 26, 1935) is an American politician and diplomat. He served as a United States Air Force pilot during the Vietnam War and spent over six years as a prisoner of the North Vietnamese army after his plane was shot down. He returned to Hanoi when he became the first United States Ambassador to Vietnam in 1997. He was an ambassador until July 2001, after which he devoted himself to philanthropic work.

Early life and education
Peterson grew up in Milton, Iowa and attended college at the University of Tampa. He joined the U.S. Air Force and served in the Vietnam War, where his F-4 Phantom II fighter was shot down on September 10, 1966. He spent six years in prison, a period he described as "hours and hours of boredom, spliced with moments of stark terror." He was released on March 4, 1973.

Career
After the Vietnam War, Peterson remained in the U.S. Air Force and retired in 1981 as a colonel with 26 years of service. After retirement he established a general contracting firm in Tampa, Florida and later a small computer company in Marianna, Florida called CRT Computers.  He served for 5 years on the faculty of Florida State University in Tallahassee, Florida.

In 1990, Peterson ran as a Democrat for a seat in the United States House of Representatives in Florida's 2nd congressional district. He defeated James W. Grant, a politician who grew unpopular after switching from the Democratic Party to the Republican Party in the middle of his second term.

He declined to run for a fourth term (he was succeeded by Allen Boyd) and in 1997 was asked by President Bill Clinton to become the United States's first post-war ambassador to Vietnam. One of his goals was securing an account of those still listed as missing in action from the war and so helping to resolve the Vietnam War POW/MIA issue.

On November 17, 2000, he was presented with the Presidential Citizens Medal by President Clinton.

Philanthropy and business
Since retiring as ambassador, Peterson founded The Alliance for Safe Children, TASC, which aims to lower preventable injuries to children worldwide, and focuses specifically on such issues as drowning in Asia. With his wife he started a company whose aim it is to promote American business in Southeast Asia.

Peterson is a senior advisor for Albright Stonebridge Group, an international strategic consulting firm.

Personal life
Peterson's first wife died in 1995. Two weeks after his installation in Hanoi, he met Vi Le, Australia's senior trade commissioner, born in Vietnam, whom he married. In 2002, he moved to Melbourne, Australia, so they could be closer to her family.

In 2009, Peterson acquired Australian citizenship.

See also

References

External links
All POW-MIA InterNetwork

1935 births
Living people
Democratic Party members of the United States House of Representatives from Florida
Politicians from Omaha, Nebraska
People from Van Buren County, Iowa
Military personnel from Iowa
University of Tampa alumni
Central Michigan University alumni
Florida State University faculty
United States Air Force colonels
United States Air Force personnel of the Vietnam War
Vietnam War prisoners of war
Shot-down aviators
Ambassadors of the United States to Vietnam
American expatriates in Australia
Presidential Citizens Medal recipients
Recipients of the Silver Star
Recipients of the Legion of Merit